Public swimming pool Kumanovo is a sport venue in Kumanovo, North Macedonia, that contains an Olympic-size indoor swimming pool and an outdoor swimming pool open for the general public. The venue was financed by the Kumanovo Municipality and it was completed and opened for public on August 2nd 2016.

References

External links
Video Plan of Indoor Pool in Kumanovo, North Macedonia
Regulation of using the Swimming Pool Macedonian
 Photo Gallery Macedonian

Kumanovo
Kumanovo Municipality